Philip D. McMurdo (born 19 May 1954) is an Australian judge. He has been a judge of the Queensland Court of Appeal since 2015; he was previously a judge of the Supreme Court of Queensland from 2003 to 2015.

He was born in Brisbane, and studied law at the University of Queensland. He was admitted as a solicitor in 1977 and admitted to the Queensland Bar in 1980. He was a part-time member of the Queensland Law Reform Commission from 1995 to 2001. His wife, Margaret McMurdo, has also served on the court.

He had been long-tipped for a Court of Appeal appointment before his promotion; in 2014, all judges apart from his wife nominated McMurdo as the most suitable choice for a vacancy, in advice that was ignored by then-Attorney-General Jarrod Bleijie. In the same year, he called for changes to judicial appointment processes following the controversy over the appointment of former Chief Justice Tim Carmody.

References

Judges of the Supreme Court of Queensland
Living people
1954 births